Stubla can refer to:

 Stubla (Bojnik), a village in Bojnik, Serbia
 Stublla (Gjakova) or Stubëll, a village in Gjakova, Kosovo
 Stubla (Medveđa), a village in Medveđa, Serbia
 Stublla e Poshtme, a village in Viti, Kosovo
 Stublla e Epërme, a village in  Viti, Kosovo